Bernard Chaus (born 1928 or 1929 - died May 31, 1991, Manhattan) was a fashion executive and with his wife, Josephine Chaus, co-founded Bernard Chaus Inc; one of the largest producers of women's sportswear and dresses in the world. He served as the company's chairman and chief executive.

References

American chief executives of fashion industry companies
1920s births
1991 deaths